Homona aestivana is a species of moth of the family Tortricidae first described by Francis Walker in 1866. It is found in the Philippines, Australia (Queensland), New Guinea (including the Bismarck Archipelago) and Indonesia (including Seram and the Sula Islands).

The larvae feed on Theobroma cacao.

References

Moths described in 1866
Homona (moth)